Calvada Meadows Airport  is a private airport located in Pahrump, Nevada, United States. It was activated in July, 1987. There are no instrument approach procedures. The airport had a limited time commercial service with Advanced Air service to Hawthorne in Los Angeles.

Facilities and aircraft 
Calvada Meadows airport has one runway (15/33), is 4081 x 48 feet and is made of asphalt. There is also one concrete helipad, 20 x 20 feet.

For the 12 month period ending September 30, 2019, the airport had approximately 131 operations per week: 96% general aviation, 3% military and less than 1% air taxi.

There are 54 aircraft based at the field: 41 single-engine, 5 multi-engine, 1 helicopter, 1 glider, and 6 ultralight.

References

External links
Official website

Airports in Nevada
Pahrump, Nevada
Buildings and structures in Nye County, Nevada
Transportation in Nye County, Nevada
Airports established in 1987
1987 establishments in Nevada